Dhari Said Abdullah is a Kuwaiti footballer who plays as a defender for Qadsia SC in the Kuwaiti Premier League.

External links
 
 

Living people
1987 births
Kuwaiti footballers
Kuwait international footballers
Association football defenders
Footballers at the 2010 Asian Games
Asian Games competitors for Kuwait
AFC Cup winning players
Qadsia SC players
Kuwait Premier League players